Joey Roukens (born in Schiedam, 28 March 1982) is a Dutch composer of contemporary classical music.

Roukens studied composition with Klaas de Vries at the Rotterdam Conservatoire and psychology at Leiden University. Roukens also studied piano privately with Ton Hartsuiker. His works have been performed by, among others, the New European Ensemble (on Dutch National TV), the Netherlands Philharmonic Orchestra, the Nieuw Ensemble, the Aurelia Saxophone Quartet and Orkest de Volharding. His output includes orchestral works, ensemble works, chamber music and solo instrumental works.

In his music Roukens strives to move away from modernist dogmas in search for a more direct idiom in which present and past, diatonicism and chromaticism, tonality and atonality can coexist in a natural way. In doing so, he tries to be open to as many different kinds and styles of music as possible, whether it be new styles or old styles, high culture or vernacular culture, ‘serious’ or popular music, western music or non-western music. For a long time, Roukens has also been active in pop music.

References

External links
Joey Roukens' Official Website

1982 births
Living people
21st-century classical composers
Dutch male classical composers
Dutch classical composers
People from Schiedam
21st-century male musicians